The 2006 Kampung Pasir landslide was a landslide that occurred on 31 May 2006, in Kampung Pasir, Ulu Klang, Selangor, Malaysia.
Two women were killed and two children were feared buried alive in a landslide that flattened three blocks of longhouses in Kampung Pasir, Ulu Klang here.

"The 2006 Kampung Pasir disaster highlighted the fact that man-made slopes needed to be built according to guidelines, just like any other infrastructure such as roads and bridges."

References

2006 in Malaysia
Gombak District
Landslides in 2006
Landslides in Malaysia
May 2006 events in Asia